Kerzeh (also known as Kerzā and Kerẕā) is a village in Deh Tall Rural District, in the Central District of Bastak County, Hormozgan Province, Iran. At the 2006 census, its population was 58, in 9 families.

References 

Populated places in Bastak County